Chaos of Forms is the third studio album by American technical death metal band Revocation, released on August 16, 2011 by Relapse Records. The song "Cradle Robber" was released and streamed on their Facebook page on May 10, 2011. This album is the last album to feature the original bassist Anthony Buda, and the first album to feature guitarist Dan Gargiulo.

Critical reception 

Chaos of Forms was well received by critics. The Daily Rotation awarded the album 9.3 out of 10, calling it "one of the best records of the year" that produces "some of the catchiest and heaviest metal since Pantera".

Track listing

Personnel 
Writing, performance and production credits are adapted from the album liner notes.

Revocation
 David Davidson – lead guitar, lead vocals
 Dan Gargiulo – rhythm guitar
 Anthony Buda – bass, backing vocals
 Phil Dubois-Coyne – drums

Additional musicians
 Davindar Singh – baritone saxophone on "The Watchers"
 Wyatt Palmer – tenor saxophone on "The Watchers"
 Derek Beckvold – alto saxophone on "The Watchers"
 Nigel Taylor – trumpet on "The Watchers"
 Pete Rutcho – organ solo on "The Watchers"

Production
 Revocation – production
 Peter Rutcho – production, recording, engineering, mixing

Artwork and design
 Orion Landau – design

Chart performance

References 

2011 albums
Relapse Records albums
Revocation (band) albums